Cyfyw was a 6th-century princess and pre-congregational Saint of Cornwall and Wales. She was the sister of St. Cadoc Cynidr and Maches.

Cyfyw was born to Saint Gwynllyw and his wife Gwladys. She was commemorated with a shrine at St David's Church, Llangeview.

References

Southwestern Brythonic saints
English Roman Catholic saints
6th-century Christian saints
Year of birth unknown
Year of death unknown